Cockerelliana is a genus of parasitic flies in the family Tachinidae.

Species
Cockerelliana capitata Townsend, 1915

Distribution
United States.

References

Diptera of North America
Dexiinae
Tachinidae genera
Monotypic Brachycera genera
Taxa named by Charles Henry Tyler Townsend